Renata Bianchi (12 July 1926 – 7 February 1966) was an Italian gymnast. She competed at the 1948 Summer Olympics and the 1952 Summer Olympics.

References

1926 births
1966 deaths
Italian female artistic gymnasts
Olympic gymnasts of Italy
Gymnasts at the 1948 Summer Olympics
Gymnasts at the 1952 Summer Olympics
Sportspeople from Genoa